"Sunday" is a song by American alternative rock band Sonic Youth. It was released in 1998 by record label Geffen as the first and only single from their 10th studio album, A Thousand Leaves.

Release 

"Sunday" was released on April 23, 1998 by record label Geffen as the first and only single from their 10th studio album, A Thousand Leaves. It reached No. 72 in the UK Singles Chart.

A different recording of the song was also featured on the soundtrack of the film SubUrbia.

Content 

The song's riff was 'borrowed' from Helium's song "Skeleton".

One of the single's B-sides, "Moist Vagina", was originally by Nirvana, who were friends of the band and appeared in the film 1991: The Year Punk Broke while touring with Sonic Youth.

Music video 

The video for "Sunday" was directed by Harmony Korine and starred Macaulay Culkin and Rachel Miner. The video made liberal use of slow- and fast-motion cameras and images of ballerinas dancing and Culkin playing a banjo and interacting with Miner.

Track listing 

 "Sunday" (LP Version) – 4:52
 "Moist Vagina" – 3:04 (Kurt Cobain)
 "Silver Panties" – 4:27
 "Sunday (Edit)" – 3:15

Chart positions

Notes 

Sonic Youth songs
1998 singles
1998 songs
Geffen Records singles